Vic Williams was a member of the Arizona House of Representatives, representing Arizona's 26th District from January 2009 until January 2013.

References

Republican Party members of the Arizona House of Representatives
1962 births
Living people